The Father Christmas Letters, also known as Letters from Father Christmas, are a collection of letters written and illustrated by J. R. R. Tolkien between 1920 and 1943 for his children, from Father Christmas. They were released posthumously by the Tolkien estate on 2 September 1976, the 3rd anniversary of Tolkien's death. They were edited by Baillie Tolkien, second wife of his youngest son, Christopher. The book was warmly received by critics, and it has been suggested that elements of the stories inspired parts of Tolkien's The Lord of the Rings.

Plot
The stories are told in the format of a series of letters, told either from the point of view of Father Christmas or his elvish secretary. They document the adventures and misadventures of Father Christmas and his helpers, including the North Polar Bear and his two sidekick cubs, Paksu and Valkotukka. The stories include descriptions of the massive fireworks that create the northern lights and how Polar Bear manages to get into trouble on more than one occasion.

The 1939 letter has Father Christmas making reference to the Second World War, while some of the later letters feature Father Christmas' battles against Goblins which were subsequently interpreted as being a reflection of Tolkien's views on the German Menace.

Publication
The letters themselves were written over a period of over 20 years to entertain Tolkien's children each Christmas. Starting in 1920 when Tolkien's oldest son was aged three, each Christmas Tolkien would write a letter from Father Christmas about his travels and adventures. Each letter was delivered in an envelope, including North Pole stamps and postage marks as designed by Tolkien.

Prior to publication, an exhibition of Tolkien's drawings was held at the Ashmolean Museum. These included works from The Hobbit, The Lord of the Rings, and The Father Christmas Letters. The first edition was by Allen and Unwin on 2 September 1976, three years after Tolkien's death. The Houghton Mifflin edition was released later that year on 19 October. It was the third work by Tolkien to be released posthumously, after a collection of poems and the Guide to the Names in The Lord of the Rings. Edited by Baillie Tolkien, the second wife of Christopher Tolkien, it includes illustrations by Tolkien for nearly all the letters; however, it omitted several letters and drawings.

When the book was republished in 1999 it was retitled Letters from Father Christmas and several letters and drawings not contained in the original edition were added. One edition in 1995 featured the letters and drawings contained in individual envelopes to be read in the manner they were originally conceived to be.

Reception
The reception to the first two works published posthumously had been warm, which was subsequently thought to be due to Tolkien's recent death. The response to The Father Christmas Letters was much more measured and balanced. Jessica Kemball-Cook suggested in her book Twentieth Century Children's Writers that it would become known as a classic of children's literature, while Nancy Willard for The New York Times Book Review also received the book positively, saying "Father Christmas lives. And never more merrily than in these pages." In 2002, an article in The Independent on Sunday described the work as rivalling "The Lord of the Rings for sheer imaginative joy".

Influence
Paul H. Kocher, whilst writing for the journal Mythprint, suggested that the creatures in The Father Christmas Letters may have been a precursor to those which appeared in Tolkien's later works such as The Lord of the Rings, a view which was shared by Laurence and Martha Krieg in a review in the journal Mythlore (issue #14). For example, the 1933 letter features an attack on Polar Bear by a band of goblins. The Kriegs suggested that the wizard Gandalf may have been developed from Father Christmas.

See also

The Life and Adventures of Santa Claus, authored by L. Frank Baum, author of the first 14 Oz books
 List of Christmas-themed literature

References

Sources

1976 children's books
Christmas literature
British children's books
Collections of works by J. R. R. Tolkien
Books by J. R. R. Tolkien
Books published posthumously
Houghton Mifflin books
Collections of letters
Allen & Unwin books
Santa Claus in fiction